Home Is Where the Van Is, an album by The Battlefield Band, was released in 1980 on the Temple Records label.  The album, the band's U.S. debut, "continued the Scottish group's affinity for blending modern instrumentation into the country's folk tradition."  Several songs from the album notably featured band member Ged Foley on the Northumbrian smallpipes.

Track listing
 "Major Malley's March & Reel/Malcolm Currie" – 2:27
 "Bonny Barbry-O" – 3:18
 "Look Across the Water/Mrs Garden of Troup/The Keelman Ower Land" – 4:29
 "Braw Lads O'Galla Water" – 3:35
 "Up & Waur Them A', Willie" – 3:25
 "Joseph McDonald's Jig/The Snuff Wife/Thief of Lochaber" – 3:56
 "Cockle Geordie/Miss Graham/Miss Thompson" – 4:01
 "The Boar and the Fox" – 4:10
 "Blackhall Rocks" – 2:53
 "The Lads O' the Fair" – 4:05
 "The Cowal Gathering/The Iron Man/Dancing Feet/Dick Gossip's Reel" – 4:34
 "Mary Cassidy" – 2:30

Personnel

Battlefield Band
Alan Reid: vocals, organ, synthesizer, electric piano
Brian McNeill: vocals, bouzouki, fiddles, cittern, concertina, hurdy-gurdy, viola
Duncan MacGillivray: vocals, Highland pipes, whistles, guitar, mouthorgan, bagpipes, harmonica
Ged Foley: vocals, mandolin, guitar, Northumbrian smallpipes

Guests
Also appearing on some songs are :
sound engineer Martin Colledge on tenor banjo/electric guitar (tracks 6, 7, 12) and 
producer Robin Morton on bodhran (track 6).

Performances
The band played the album in its entirety at the 2009 Celtic Connections, as part of the festival's Classic Albums series. The performance featured the line-up who recorded the album in 1980 (Alan Reid, Brian McNeill, Duncan MacGillivray & Ged Foley), playing together with the line-up of 2009 (Alan Reid, Mike Katz, Alasdair White & Sean O'Donnell).

References

External links
Interview about Home Is Where The Van Is with Archie Fisher, from BBC Radio Scotland

Battlefield Band albums
1980 albums
Celtic folk albums